Circuit du Mas du Clos is a racing circuit located in Mas du Clos, Saint-Avit-de-Tardes, France. It was founded by Pierre Bardinon, one of the most famous Ferrari collectors in the world, in 1963. The track was initially created for private use before being opened to the public for private events by his son Patrick Bardinon, who took over ownership of the track when his father passed away. The track is now managed by racing driver Alexandre Bardinon, the grandson of the founder.

As of 2010, the race track is also the base of a modern and historical race team well known under the name "Mas Du Clos Racing MCR".

The château located next to the track was also owned by Pierre Bardinon. Patrick Bardinon now owns it, as well as a private collection of Ferrari road and racing cars.

References

External links 
 Corner by corner analysis of the Circuit du Mas du Clos track - www.super-trackday.com

Motorsport venues in France
Sports venues in Creuse